Enrico Bizzotto (born 7 September 1965) is a retired Swiss football midfielder.

References

1965 births
Living people
Swiss men's footballers
FC Luzern players
FC Zürich players
Association football midfielders
Swiss Super League players